The Thomas Subdivision is a railroad line owned by CSX Transportation in the U.S. states of Maryland and West Virginia. At its east end the line continues west from the Mountain Subdivision and at its west end the line comes to an end.

See also
 List of CSX Transportation lines

References

CSX Transportation lines